Luigi Cocilovo (born 7 October 1947, in Palermo) is an Italian Member of the European Parliament and a University researcher in Law. He was elected on the Olive Tree ticket and sits with the Alliance of Liberals and Democrats for Europe group.

On 20 July 2004 he was elected one of the 14 Vice-Presidents of the European Parliament.

External links
Luigi Cocilovo MEP, official site
MEP Profile of Luigi Cocilovo, European Parliament

1947 births
Living people
Catania, Giusto
Democratic Party (Italy) MEPs
MEPs for Italy 2004–2009
MEPs for Italy 1999–2004
Democracy is Freedom – The Daisy politicians